Gregory Lee Bracelin (born April 16, 1957) is a former American football linebacker in the National Football League. He attended De Anza Senior High School.

References

External links
Stats at databasefootball.com

1957 births
Living people
Sportspeople from Lawrence, Kansas
Players of American football from Kansas
American football linebackers
California Golden Bears football players
Denver Broncos players
Oakland Raiders players
Baltimore Colts players
Indianapolis Colts players
Sportspeople from Kansas